Akgüney can refer to:

 Akgüney, Bayramören
 Akgüney, İnebolu
 Akgüney, İspir